Root for Ruin is Les Savy Fav's fifth studio album. Its scheduled release date was September 14, 2010, but after the album leaked in late July it was given a digital release on August 3, 2010.

Track listing

“Appetites” - 3:33
“Dirty Knails” - 3:06
“Sleepless in Silverlake” - 3:41
“Let's Get Out of Here” - 3:33
“Lips n' Stuff” - 3:48
“Poltergeist” - 3:42
“High and Unhinged” - 3:53
“Excess Energies” - 3:03
“Dear Crutches” - 4:13
“Calm Down” - 2:46
“Clear Spirits” - 3:53

Credits

Les Savy Fav 
 Tim Harrington – vocals
 Seth Jabour – guitar
 Andrew Reuland – guitar
 Syd Butler – bass
 Harrison Haynes – drums

References

2010 albums
Les Savy Fav albums
Frenchkiss Records albums